Robert Parry was a  17th-century Anglican priest in Ireland.

A cousin of Edward Parry, Bishop of Killaloe, Robert Parry was Dean of Lismore from 1647 until his death in 1660.

References

17th-century Irish Anglican priests
Deans of Lismore